Iqaluit Kangiqtunga (Inuktitut syllabics: ᐃᖃᓗᐃᑦ ᑲᖏᖅᑐᖓ) formerly Shaftesbury Inlet is a body of water in the Qikiqtaaluk Region of Nunavut, Canada. It lies in western Hudson Strait, forming a wedge into Baffin Island's Meta Incognita Peninsula. The Inuit community of Kimmirut is to the northwest, while Kangiqtualujjuaq is to the southeast.

References

Inlets of Baffin Island